Thomas Joseph Hickey (January 4, 1930 – October 19, 2016), was an American politician who was a Democratic member of the Nevada General Assembly (1973–1982) and the Nevada Senate (1983–1994). An alumnus of the University of Nebraska, he was a former brakeman with the Union Pacific Railroad.

References

1930 births
2016 deaths
Democratic Party members of the Nevada Assembly
Democratic Party Nevada state senators
Politicians from Omaha, Nebraska
People from the Las Vegas Valley
University of Nebraska alumni